was a professional Japanese right-handed pitcher. He played for the Chunichi Dragons.

On 23 September 2016, it was announced that Iwata was to retire from professional baseball.

References

External links

 NPB.com

1987 births
Living people
Baseball people from Gifu Prefecture
Meiji University alumni
Nippon Professional Baseball pitchers
Chunichi Dragons players
Navegantes del Magallanes players
Japanese baseball coaches
Nippon Professional Baseball coaches
Japanese expatriate baseball players in Venezuela